The Integrated Public Transport System is the public transport system in Bogotá, the capital and largest city of Colombia. It integrates bus rapid transit (BRT), bus and gondola lift services in the metropolitan area of Bogotá.

History

Beginnings and tender
During the 2007 campaign for the election of mayor of the city, the candidate Samuel Moreno Rojas had as a campaign proposal, in addition to the construction of phase III of TransMilenio and the Bogotá Metro, the implementation of an ambitious project whose mission was to order and integrate the traditional public transport system with TransMilenio.

In October 2009 and then as mayor, Moreno announced the start of the tender of the 13 zones in which the city was divided and to which an operator and the System of Collection and Control of Information (Sirci) would be assigned. On December 18 of that same year, Javier Hernández was appointed as manager of the SITP, a position he would occupy until March 2012.

During the first four days of March 2010, the Moreno administration suffered one of the biggest crises with a transporters strike demanded their inclusion in the SITP and managing to paralyze the city. Finally, and after extensive negotiations, Moreno and the transporters agreed to include them among the bidding companies and scrap projects for the very old buses that could not enter the system, which implied a delay in the assignment of the operators. In November, all that was needed was the tender for an area.

Delays
In 2011, with all the operators assigned and waiting to sign contracts, a judge of the republic revoked the bidding process for the award of the Sirci, arguing that the process had not received sufficient attention by the control entities and that they were still missing key points to be defined in the contract that would be signed by the winning company. This delay, together with the outbreak of a corruption case of the hiring involving Mayor Moreno and senior officials of the mayor's office, would be the main reasons in the delay of the implementation of the system, which lasts until today. On June 16 of this year, it was finally possible to award the collection of fares for the system, calculated at 2.7 billion pesos per year, to the company Recaudo Bogotá S.A. with a 16-year contract.

In spite of the promises of the manager of TransMilenio during that time, Fernando Páez, that the SITP would begin operations in December 2011, due to delays in the delivery of phase III of said system, Paéz himself had to say in September that it would not be until May 2012 when the gradual implementation of routes could be initiated. On the other hand, already from this time, a problem was noticed about people's ignorance of the system and lack of pedagogy. Finally, on December 31 and after three years of delay, the mayor in charge of Bogotá, Clara López, received the works of Phase III of TransMilenio, which meant a great advance in unlocking the implementation of the system.

Start of operation

In January 2012, with the entry of Gustavo Petro to the mayor's office and a new cabinet, it was reported that the works of phase III were incomplete and that there would still be time until the start of their operations. For this reason, it was announced that the SITP could start until June 9 of the same year. In addition, the first financial problems of the Coobus SAS operator began to be reported. who was in charge of Calle 26 and the Fontibón zone. During May of the same year, tests were begun on Phase III of TransMilenio, with satisfactory results. Despite this, the administration was unable to comply with the date given for the start of operations on the Calle 26 and Carrera 10 trunk lines.

On June 30, despite pressure from various sectors, Gobernación and El Dorado Portal stations began operation on Calle 26 for free due to delays in the implementation of the fare collection system. Finally, with a fare adjustment from July 22, the operation is gradually implemented in phase III. Immediately, another problem of the system surfaced and it is the use of two different cards, one for phase I and II and another for SITP and phase III.

Although it had been said that the first urban route would begin to operate in August, it was until September 22 that two urban routes began operating in pedagogical mode. The route of one of them is from El Dorado Airport to the Andino Shopping Center and the other from Altos de Zuque to Paloquemao. Complementary routes began operation on November 1, 2012, special routes on December 1, 2012, and the traditional bus system was formally abolished on September 16, 2016, thus integrating public transport in Bogotá.

Accident in Usme

On July 10, 2013, the worst accident in the system registered to date occurred, which left 3 people dead and 19 injured. Apparently it was caused by a failure in the brakes of the automotive. According to subsequent investigations, the bus had all its revisions up to date, however, this tragic event caused a wave of control by the authorities that revealed the precarious state of the old buses used in the system.

Double card

Despite early warnings from the fare collection company, the SITP, including Phase III of TransMilenio, started its operation with a new card not compatible with the existing collection system in Phases I and II. In 2013, the Phase III stations were enabled to read the Phase I and II cards, and in parallel with these phases, turnstiles that read the SITP card began to be installed. From November 28, 2013, the buses of the SITP can read the cards of phase I and II. Finally, in 2015 the gradual change of the collection system began in the stations of Phases I and II, and since September of the same year all the stations of the system and the zonal buses allow the use of all the cards, which allowed the SITP to be fully integrated.

Rollout
Since the start of the system and until 2022, urban, complementary and special routes have been gradually implemented, although with serious delays with respect to the schedule. In addition, lack of contracts for the installation of stops of the zonal routes was also reported, which were awarded in August 2012 and that little by little have replaced the improvised yellow lines painted on the platform to demarcate the bus stop

Despite the slow implementation of the system, as of 2022 the zonal component has 347 routes and 7,516 bus stops throughout the city that are served by 6,881 urban, complementary and special buses. After a long debate and a large number of proposals dating from mayor Moreno, it has been said that Carrera Séptima will be served by hybrid buses that would connect to TransMilenio at the National Museum station and that they would start operating by mid-December 2013.

On the other hand, the system has been affected by serious financial problems, which imply the bankruptcy of operators Coobus S.A.S. (Fontibón zone and Calle 26 trunk line) and Egobus (Center Suba and Perdomo zones), and serious deficits due to the reduction of tariffs in mid-2012 with the implementation of the system. Despite this, the system seeks to be more accessible to the most vulnerable population and allow subsidies to those who need it most. This includes the population that is covered by the National System of Beneficiaries (SISBEN).

Services
The SITP is composed of the trunk, feeder and zonal components. It has six services that fulfill a specific function, and each one is identified with the color of the vehicles: TransMiCable and trunk (red), feeder (green), urban (blue), complementary (orange) and special (maroon) buses. These last three services form the zonal component, which has a headway of 5-7 min during peak hours and 10-20 min during off-peak.

Trunk component

It is the BRT TransMilenio system included in the SITP and is a trunk-feeding system. It is identified with the color red, with variations to the front and back depending on the type of bus, which are: fully red for the articulated, yellow designs front and back for the bi-articulate and gray designs front and back for the dual buses. This service operates through exclusive lanes and stops at stations and portals located in the center of the road. In addition, the dual buses have doors for the platforms on the left side and on the right side for stops. Each route has variations and can be a regular (stops at all stations) or an express service (stops at few stations). Payment is made at the entrance to stations by means of a smart card.

Route planning tools 
There are several applications for mobile devices and desktop to consult schedules, routes and plan the most suitable option for any route between two points of Bogota. Some of them are:

 Google Maps: web, Play Store, App Store.
 TransMi App: Transmilenio official app; web, Play Store.
 Transmilenio y Sitp: Play Store, App Store.
 MaaSapp: Play Store, App Store.
 Moovit: web, Play Store, App Store, Microsoft Store.

Zones 
The urban area of Bogotá is divided into 13 zones and a neutral zone, which are operated and integrated together with the current and future trunk lines of TransMilenio, Metro, TransMiCable and commuter train as follows:

Operators 
They correspond to the trunk bus system and zonal buses, that is, the special, complementary, urban buses and also the TransMilenio feeder buses.

Fleet 

SITP and its predecessor agencies have ordered buses from a variety of manufacturers over the years, including GMC, Flxible, Scania, Mercedes-Benz, Chevrolet, Volkswagen, Volvo, New Flyer Industries, El Dorado National, Orion Bus Industries, Thomas Built Buses, Blue Bird Corporation, and North American Bus Industries (NABI). SITP has the second largest bus fleet in Latin America with 9,339 buses.

See also 
 Bogotá Metro
 TransMilenio

References 

Bogotá
Public transport in Colombia
2012 establishments in Colombia